Alessandro, Principe Ruspoli (October 5, 1784 – October 31, 1842) was the 4th Prince of Cerveteri, 4th Marquis of Riano, 9th Count of Vignanello and Prince of the Holy Roman Empire, son of Francesco Ruspoli, 3rd Prince of Cerveteri and second wife HSH Leopoldina Gräfin von Khevenhüller-Metsch. He had for brothers, among others, Camillo Ruspoli, Duke of Sueca, and Bartolomeo Ruspoli and Khevenhüller-Metsch. His granduncle was Bartolomeo Ruspoli.

Alessandro is the ancestor of the Line I of the Princes Ruspoli.

Marriage and children 
He married in Vienna, June 4, 1805 Marianna Gräfin Esterházy de Galántha (Nagyszeben, January 23, 1786 – December 11, 1821), by whom he had eight children:

 Donna Giovanna dei Principi Ruspoli (June 28, 1806 – April 5, 1830), married on May 21, 1828 Pompeo, Conte di Campello
 Donna Virginia dei Principi Ruspoli (Rome, June 5, 1807 – April 13, 1878), married on May 19, 1834 Giovanni, Conte Manassei
 Giovanni Nepomucene Ruspoli, 5th Prince of Cerveteri
 Donna Carolina dei Principi Ruspoli (July 29, 1809 – April 28, 1873), unmarried and without issue
 Don Amedeo dei Principi Ruspoli (October 2, 1811 – August 29, 1812), unmarried and without issue
 Don Luigi dei Principi Ruspoli (September 15, 1813 – July 17, 1887), married on November 25, 1853 Idaline Gräfin von Qualen, without issue
 Don Eugenio dei Principi Ruspoli (November 1, 1814 – September 14, 1878), married on April 9, 1845 Pauline-Thérèse de Sicard (– August 13, 1867), without issue
 Don Augusto dei Principi Ruspoli, Honorary Principe di Cerveteri (Vignanello, June 6, 1817 – Rome, July 2, 1882), married at Pozsony/Pressburg, June 6, 1846, his first cousin Agnes Gräfin Esterházy de Galántha (Nagyszeben, February 19, 1818 – Terni, August 5, 1899), and had three sons:
 Don Galeazzo dei Principi Ruspoli (Vignanello, June 4, 1847 – Rome, February 4, 1927), married in Rome, November 26, 1885 Angelica Frascara (Alessandria, February 17, 1861 – October 15, 1906), and had a son and a daughter:
 Don Alfonso dei Principi Ruspoli (Rome, June 13, 1887 – Rome, April 8, 1964), unmarried and without issue
 Donna Maria dei Principi Ruspoli (Rome, February 11, 1889 – Florence, July 6, 1937), married in Rome, April 23, 1914 Giulio Barbolani dei Conti di Montauto (Florence, August 13, 1876 – August 12, 1950)
 Don Alfonso dei Principi Ruspoli (November 5, 1849 – February 11, 1885), unmarried and without issue
 Don Mario dei Principi Ruspoli (September 4, 1855 – San Remo, February 29, 1888), married at Albano, October 25, 1879, as her first husband Costanza Boncompagni-Ludovisi-Ottoboni (Rome, June 28, 1858 – November 11, 1904), and had a son and a daughter:
 Augusto Ruspoli, 11th Duke of Fiano
 Donna Luisa dei Principi Ruspoli (Rome, May 28, 1885 – Rome, October 15, 1893)

External links 
 Alessandro Ruspoli on a genealogical site

See also 
 Ruspoli

1784 births
1842 deaths
Alessandro
Alessandro